Nneka Obiamaka Onyejekwe (born August 18, 1989 in Hațeg) is a Romanian professional volleyball player who played as a middle blocker for CS Volei Alba-Blaj and now plays for Dinamo Bucharest and the Romania national team.

She was born in Hațeg to a Romanian mother and Nigerian father, both intellectuals, and was raised in Cluj-Napoca. One of her brothers, Chike, plays handball professionally.

Honours

Clubs
 2011, 2012, 2013 Swiss Championship –  Champion, with Voléro Zürich
 2011, 2012, 2013 Swiss Cup – Champion, with Voléro Zürich  
 2010, 2011 Swiss Super Cup – Champion, with Voléro Zürich 
 2007, 2008, 2009, 2010 Romanian Championship – Champion, with Metal Galați
 2007, 2008, 2009 Romanian Cup – Champion, with Metal Galați
 2017–18 CEV Champions League - Runner-Up, with CSM Volei Alba Blaj

Individual awards  
2017–18 CEV Champions League "Best Middle Blocker" 
 2017 Romanian Volleyball Player of the Year
 2018 Romanian Volleyball Player of the Year

See also
Romania women's national volleyball team

References

External links
Voléro Zürich profile
Soccerway profile
Profile at CEV
Profile at FIVB

1989 births
Living people
Romanian women's volleyball players
Romanian expatriate sportspeople in Switzerland
People from Hunedoara County
Romanian people of Nigerian descent
European Games competitors for Romania
Volleyball players at the 2015 European Games
Romanian expatriate sportspeople in Germany
Romanian expatriate sportspeople in France
Expatriate volleyball players in Switzerland
Expatriate volleyball players in France
Expatriate volleyball players in Germany